Yeshu haNotzri may refer to:
 Yeshu
 Jesus
 Jesus in the Talmud